State Road 99 is a  north–south highway running along Belulah Avenue in unincorporated Escambia County, Florida. It is the westernmost north–south two-digit highway in Florida. The southern terminus is at the intersection with Mobile Highway (US 90/SR 10A) and Belulah Avenue (CR 99 south), while the northern terminus is at the intersection of Isaacs Lane and Belulah Avenue (CR 99 north).

History
SR 99 was originally one continuous route, defined from US 90 Alt. north to Walnut Hill, then west on current SR 99A to Pineville and back north to the Alabama state line near Nokomis. It was later cut back to run only from Barrineau Park to Walnut Hill, and was subsequently extended north to Alabama, replacing State Road 380. The original alignment south of Muscogee was restored at some point, while Muscogee to Barrineau Park (with a different alignment at the Muscogee end) became a second segment of SR 97 (now CR 97), and Walnut Hill to Pineville became part of SR 99A. The road from Pineville north never received a number after SR 99 was removed from it.

In 2019, the Florida Department of Transportation and Escambia County signed a road swap agreement that would return State Road 99 to the state highway system, bringing back the portion running on Beulah Road from US 90 to Isaacs Lane, with plans to study a new corridor to extend SR 99 to US 29. In 2019, the road was restored to the SHS.

Major intersections

Related routes

County Road 99
Escambia County Road 99 (CR 99) consists of the road that comprised the original SR 99. CR 99 starts at a cul-de-sac in the neighborhood of Hurst Hammock near the Perdido River. The road continues north through rural neighborhoods until it intersects with Mobile Highway (US 90 / SR 10A), where it continues north as SR 99.

CR 99 picks up again north of the intersection with Isaacs Avenue, traveling over I-10 without an interchange before ending at CR 184 (Muscogee Road) in Muscogee. A second segment begins where CR 196 ends, in Barrineau Park east of the Perdido River. It heads north through Bay Springs and McKinnon to meet SR 97 in Walnut Hill, with which it has a wrong-way concurrency before turning back north, traveling through Oak Grove, crossing CR 4 in Bratt, ending at the Alabama state line. The road continues in Escambia County, Alabama as CR 8, which ends at US 31 west of Canoe, Alabama.

County Road 99A
County Road 99A (CR 99A), formerly State Road 99A, begins at CR 99 in Oak Grove and heads west, crossing SR 97 in Walnut Hill and ending in Pineville.

References

099
099